Arctic geopolitics is the area study of geopolitics on the Arctic region. The study of geopolitics deals with the "inalienable relationship between geography and politics", as it investigates the effects of the Earth's geography on politics and international relations. Arctic geopolitics focuses on the inter-state relations in the Arctic, which is the northernmost polar region. It is composed of the Arctic Ocean and its adjacent seas, and is home to around four million people. The states in or bordering the Arctic are commonly referred to as the Arctic Eight, and are the United States, Canada, Russia, Finland, the Kingdom of Denmark (Greenland), Norway, Iceland and Sweden.

The Arctic is one of the Earth's most unique environments. It is seasonally snow and ice covered and the indigenous peoples inhabiting it, such as the Sami and the Inuit peoples, adapted to its extreme cold, making up about a third of the Arctic's population. They coexist with the Arctic's unique ecosystems, which are some of the world's most vulnerable to climate change. The Arctic is also home to what is estimated to be nearly a quarter of the world's oil, gas and mineral deposits. The United States Geological Survey (USGS) assesses that the resources within the Arctic Circle account for 22% of undiscovered but recoverable resources in the world.

Geopolitical activity in the frozen Arctic has historically been fairly low. However, the onset of global warming is changing the region's geopolitical conditions. Over time, the Arctic melting is expected to reveal under-water resources and new shipping opportunities, which led to a fear of inter-state hostility in a scramble for new territories following the Russian flag planting on the North Pole sea bed in 2007. In reality, states bartered for unsettled territories in a peaceful manner after the Arctic states signed the 2008 Ilulissat Declaration committing themselves to peaceful cooperation, while events such as the Ukraine Crisis in 2014 had very marginal spill-over on the region. In 2019, most of the Arctic states are engaged in developing the governance of the region, such as bilateral agreements and Search and Rescue capabilities.

The Arctic Region 

There exists different understandings of what the Arctic region is. According to Igor Krupnik the easiest definition of the Arctic is the north circumpolar area of the Earth, "encompassing the edges of the Eurasian and North American continents, and the island and adjacent waters of the Arctic, Pacific and Atlantic oceans". It is more complicated to pin down exactly where the Arctic begins and ends. In the geographical sense it is now common to equate the Arctic boundary with the +10 degrees Celsius isotherm of the warmest month of the year, which puts the Arctic at about 25 million square kilometres. Ecologists prefer to associate the Arctic boundary with the natural frontier of the Arctic tree line, making the region bigger than indicated by the isotherm measurement.

Political, cultural or anthropological boundaries are more contested. Distinguishing the Arctic from other areas by understandings of 'Arctic nations', 'the Arctic five' or 'Arctic economies' is common in both academia and popular literature. Anthropological understandings are subjective in the sense that ethnographic and political spaces "precede and produce established facts". The operational understanding is suggested by the IASC (International Arctic Science Committee). The IASC is exclusive to the Arctic Eight, who are awarded permanent status over other Arctic-interested nations and are "gradually becoming a grouping of political recognition".

The Arctic has attracted a lot of attention from critical security studies and maritime security, where it is a well-researched area. The region's frozen ecosystem combined with the fact that its political scene operates in isolation from the rest of the world creates a unique geopolitical theatre. Because of its unique polar geography and high sensitivity to climate change, the Arctic is also a leading indicator for environmental security studies. "Arctic amplification" means the Earth's poles are more sensitive to climate change than anywhere else on the planet. Global warming causes uncertainty in what possibilities a thawed Arctic will create, as well as concern for how states will respond to possibilities of new territories and resources, as it remains unclear exactly what changes global warming will unleash on the region.

Scholarly and journalistic interest in the region is also encouraged by the sentiments and narratives associated with the Arctic. The Russian flag planting on the North Pole seabed in 2007 to claim the Lomonosov Ridge sparked a story of 'the Great Game in the North' and the 'Scramble for the Arctic', even though states in reality settled for territories peacefully in accordance with international law set out by UNCLOS. The same event also kindled comparisons to expeditions of exploration and conquest of flag-planting pioneers. There exists an idealisation of the Arctic as an imagined isolated land frozen in time. While research determines the isolation narrative does not describe real Arctic politics, imaginaries play an important role for actors and institutions in the Arctic to make sense of the region.

Climate change and geopolitics 

Climate change is crucial to Arctic geopolitics and has led to a renewed interest in the region's resources. The Arctic is experiencing the fast and drastic climate change with a temperature increase of 1.9 degrees C in the last 30 years. Climate change causes receding ice sheets, rising air and marine temperatures, melting of the Greenland ice sheet and decline of sea ice, ocean acidification and extreme weather events such as flooding, fires and drought. The thawing of the permafrost may release methane gases while natural resource stresses risk biological migration and extinction. The effect of Arctic amplification whereby the Earth's poles are more sensitive to climate changes than other areas of the planet means the Arctic and the Antarctic are seen as leading indicators of global warming. Snow and ice regimes are especially sensitive to even small increases in temperatures, while cold oceans are sensitive to changes in salinity, making the Arctic climate a complex and vulnerable system. These changes brought by global warming are also causing increased demands on governance in the Arctic as vulnerable ecosystems must be protected from increased human activity, including overfishing and water pollution.

While climate change will have uncertain and disastrous effects on the Arctic, it will also free undiscovered marine resources and open up shipping routes as the region melts. "The melting of the ice in the Arctic due to global warming is expected to cause major environmental and geopolitical changes in the Arctic". These environmental developments have led to fears in journalism and academia of an increased likelihood in geopolitical conflict. According to traditional international relations theory, states are self-interested actors who try to maximise their own gains. As explained by scholar Stokke, there is a direct link between climate change and resource-related conflict: "inherent in the concept of environmental security is the understanding that threats arising from environmental degradation and resource rivalry may prove severe enough to generate violent conflict. The geopolitical consequence of global warming is as such that there is a link between access to valuable resources and sovereign territory. The Arctic has been a known source of natural resources since the first explorers discovered whales, seals and fish. The three most important resources in the Arctic are minerals, fish stocks and huge oil and gas reserves, most of which are located in Russian territories. "Long-term interstate conflict potential" in the Arctic lies in access to petroleum and minerals, renewable marine resources or shipping lanes.

Limited commercial prospects 

Despite climatic changes and Arctic shrinkage, the commercial prospects of extracting resources are limited and speculative. While gas is believed to be the most common hydrocarbon in the region, developing Arctic oil and gas fields will be a slow and costly process. Further, Norway and Russia already have bilateral partnerships in place for cooperation in oil and fishing. Because "continuity marks many of the factors that constrain trans-Arctic shipping, while the climate effects on the economics of resource use in the Arctic remain ambiguous", climate change may not change the commercial viability of the Arctic Ocean greatly. The Arctic's extreme conditions mean that the recoverability of oil in the Arctic Ocean is practically difficult and expensive, meaning governments are unlikely to risk war over oil reserves in the Arctic.

Territorial claims 

The emergence of undiscovered marine resources and new shipping routes from global warming caused an increased commercial interest in the region by Arctic states. This heightened profile also invites speculation and exaggeration - "global coverage of Arctic politics since 2007 has fed popular narratives about the potential for conflict in the region". The first event to spark concern was the Russian expedition of two small submarines to plant a Russian flag (Arktika 2007) on the North Pole seabed to claim the Lomonosov Ridge as a part of the Russian continental shelf. This was a demonstration of Russia's bid to gain rights to the large supplies of hydrocarbons on the seabed. According to the 1982 UN Convention on the Law of the Sea (UNCLOS), coastal states have rights to the exploration and extraction of marine resources within their exclusive economic zone (EEZ), which extends 200 nautical miles off their coast. Beyond the EEZ territory is open to consultation as per clauses 4-7 if a state can prove the sea floor is an extension of its own continental shelf. Russia's Natural Resources Ministry stated in 2007 that the crust structure of the ridge corresponds to the Russian continental crust, and should thus be considered part of Russia's continental shelf. Russia's claim to the Lomonosov Ridge is still contested by Canada and Denmark, who filed a claim with the UN Commission in 2014 based on the connection between Greenland and Lomonosov. Russia submitted another bid in 2015. The legal status of the shelf remains disputed because generally recognised research on the seabed is lacking. The US has meanwhile signed but not ratified the UNCLOS, and cannot submit any claims.

The disputed status of the Lomonosov Ridge has failed to cause any serious conflict. There has been significant progress in settling sovereignty questions in the Arctic, and most resources lie within settled boundaries already. The remaining contested or unclaimed areas of the Arctic which states have wished to acquire are the US versus the Russian Federation in the Bering Sea, the US versus Canada in the Beaufort Sea and Canada versus Denmark in the Davis Strait. Canada and Denmark are involved in a dispute over Hans Island in the Nares Strait. Canada also considers the Northwest Passage to be part of its own waters while most other states view the passage as an international strait, but has not initiated any legal proceedings. Russia and Norway resolved the dispute over the Barents Sea in 2010, but they still dispute fishing rights in the exclusive economic zone (EEZ) around the island of Svalbard. In the post-2007 period scholars generally concur that conflict over territory in the Arctic is unlikely. The Arctic Institute determines there are no politically significant conflicts over maritime and territorial boundaries left after the Barents Sea dispute was resolved.

Multilateral cooperation and the Arctic Council 

The signing of the Ilulissat Declaration in 2008 left little room for future serious conflict between the Arctic states. The decision to sign the declaration by the Arctic 5 was a deliberate response the misrepresentations of expansionist Russia in media and the dispute over Hans Island. The signatory states discussed the division of emergency responsibilities should new shipping lanes emerge by climate change, and pledged themselves to "the orderly settlement of any possible overlapping claims" for territorial disputes. They consequently pledged themselves to developing the governance of the region, including protecting the environment, through peaceful cooperation under the auspices of international law. The declaration sets the tone for the strategic future of the region as it emphasised cooperation under international law in the issues of "protection of marine environment, reducing the risk of ship based pollution, strengthening search and rescue capabilities, enhancing maritime safety, cooperation on scientific research and enhanced disaster response mechanisms".

Although the whole of the Arctic Council was not involved in the Ilulissat Declaration, which only invited the coastal states of the Arctic Ocean, the Arctic Council is the main intergovernmental regional forum of the Arctic. The permanent members of its Council are the Arctic 8, and its purpose is to deal with the governance issues faced by the Arctic states and the indigenous people of the Arctic. The Council is actively furthering the region's governance, for example in having a unique Search and Rescue agreement which covers all land and water above the Arctic Circle. This is unusual since it transcends the land-water divide which underpins the modern state system. Thereby the Arctic Council through creative interpretations of existing norms, "successfully reproduces the norms of the state system and the rule of law, thereby facilitating the intensification of the region as a zone of commercial activity".

As the region opens up from climate change, the demands on governance are motivating states to expand their navies and military programmes. Some authors like Huebert have interpreted this as a sign of concern. but analyses of Russia's military modernisation programmes have shown that military capabilities are taking on policing and regulatory tasks, such as Search and Rescue. Canada is also upgrading their military equipment and doctrines for better control of the Arctic and responding to emergencies. According to Konyshev and Sergunin, military power in the Arctic is becoming characterised by policing functions, to "prevent illegal migration and potential terrorist attacks against critical industrial and infrastructural objects, fulfil some dual-use functions (such as search and rescue operations, monitoring air and maritime spaces, providing navigation safety, mitigating natural and man-made catastrophes)".

Literature 
The 2007 Russian flag planting sparked concerns in academia and journalism that states would scramble for territories in the Arctic, and created a debate on whether the situation in the Arctic would lead to conflict. The question of conflict versus cooperation has defined much of International Relations research on Arctic geopolitics, with some authors arguing strongly for an against and others in the middle. The Russian flag planting was followed by a cascade of journalists and academics publishing work on the "'scramble for the poles', the 'rush for resources' and the 'new Great Game in the North'". The Russian expedition caused pessimistic assessments of the security situation of the Arctic, especially from American and Canadian academics. They take the view that the "vast untapped resources", in particular oil and natural gas of which the extraction is not limited by federal or state law, may cause regional rivalry in conjunction with an aggressive and remilitarised Russia.

The first such publication was 'Arctic Meltdown: The Economic and Security Implications of Global Warming' by Borgerson, who warned of Russian aggression and argued a scramble for territory and resources was underway. The common argument from this perspective is that competition over emerging resources will not necessarily lead to outright military conflict, but military activity and acts of aggression signal a return to traditional power politics. Several works on the gold rush theme were published between 2008 and 2019, but most of them such as Anderson and Byers point out that the majority of resources lie within settled boundaries already and that states prefer to use international law and institutions to mediate disputes, evidenced by the claims submitted to UNCLOS and the signing of the Ilulissat Declaration.

Legitimate concerns for conflict in the Arctic weakened after the signing of the Ilulissat Declaration in 2008, after which the alarmist views became increasingly marginalised. Authors now mostly agree that research seriously considering conflict escalation "counts on incomplete and oversimplified data and assumptions and can hardly survive a rigorous verification and a confrontation with the reality of the situation". The Barents Sea dispute between Russia and Norway was the last substantial conflict and was resolved in 2010, and the Arctic Institute determines there are no politically significant conflicts over maritime and territorial boundaries anymore.

Later works on the Arctic conflict question after 2010 come from diverse perspectives of foreign policy, international law and environmental security and generally approve of a broader approach than a realist interest-based model. As Knecht and Keil say, the Arctic states are seeking to establish sovereign rights over the Arctic Ocean and the North Pole not necessarily just to gain ownership of resources, but to demarcate "distinct areas of state responsibility" for regional governance. In international media the Arctic has been framed and portrayed as a potential conflict zone, particularly due to its undiscovered resources. However considering the still limited exploitability of those resources and the Arctic's strong record of post-Cold War peace and cooperation, the strategic state of the Arctic region appears to be fairly stable and the likelihood of geopolitical conflict continues to be low.

References 

Arctic
Geopolitical rivalry
Natural resource conflicts
Arctic Ocean